Sally Lloyd-Jones is a British children's book writer.

Background 
Lloyd-Jones was born in Kampala, Uganda and studied Art History with French at University of Sussex and Paris-Sorbonne University. She is not related to the famous minister Martyn Lloyd-Jones.

She worked in children's book publishing for several years at Oxford University Press before moving to the US in 1989 where she lives in Manhattan. In 2000 she began to write full-time. She is a member of Redeemer Presbyterian Church.

The children's arm of Zondervan (Zonderkidz) published The Jesus Storybook Bible in 2007, written by Sally Lloyd-Jones and illustrated by Jago,  has sold two million copies  in 19 languages. In 2015 it was included in the Evangelical Christian Publishers Association (ECPA) Top 100 Best-sellers list.

Jago also illustrated her 2012 book Thoughts to Make Your Heart Sing which was inspired by her niece who was being bullied at school.

Nashville-based artists Rain For Roots (featuring Sandra McCracken, Ellie Holcomb, Flo Paris, and Katy Bowser) based their 2012 debut album Big Stories For Little Ones on the poems of Sally Lloyd-Jones.

Awards
 New York Times Notable 2007 for How to Be a Baby...by Me, the Big Sister
 Evangelical Christian Publishers Association Notable Award Category: Children's Recordings 2010.
 NAPPA Award Winner 2009
 Gold Moonbeam Children's Book Award 2007
 Best Inspirational Book at the 2013 Evangelical Christian Publishers Association

Selected books
 Little One We Knew You'd Come Frances Lincoln Children's Books (1 Oct 2006) 
 Handbag Friends David Fickling Books (6 Oct 2005) 
 How to Be a Baby: By Me, the Big Sister Schwartz & Wade Books (13 Feb 2007) 
 The Jesus Storybook Bible  Zondervan, 2007  
 Old Macnoah Had an Ark HarperCollins (Jan 2008) 
 The Ultimate Guide to Grandmas & Grandpas! HarperCollins (May 2008) 
 Time to Say Goodnight  Harper Trophy (1 May 2009) 
 Being a Pig Is Nice: A Child's-Eye View of Manners Schwartz & Wade Books (12 May 2009) 
 How To Be a Baby, by Me, the Big Sister Walker (7 Sep 2009) 
 Lift the Flap Bible (Lift-the-Flap Book) Candle Books (25 Jun 2010) 
 Baby's Hug-a-Bible HarperFestival (1 Feb 2010) 
 How to Get Married, by Me, the Bride Walker Books (3 May 2010)  
 A Child's First Bible Authentic Publishing (8 April 2011) 
 How to Get a Job by Me, the Boss Schwartz & Wade Books (10 May 2011) 
 Song of the Stars: A Christmas Story  Zondervan (18 Oct 2011) 
 Tiny Bear's Bible (Children's Bible) Candle Books (20 April 2012) 
 Thoughts to Make Your Heart Sing with Jago Zondervan (7 Sep 2012)

References

External links
Official website

Living people
Alumni of the University of Sussex
University of Paris alumni
British children's writers
People from Kampala
British emigrants to the United States
Year of birth missing (living people)